Marlan is a given name. Notable people with the name include:

Marlan Coughtry (born 1934), former backup infielder in Major League Baseball
Marlan O. Scully, physicist best known for his work in theoretical quantum optics
Marlan (fabric), flame retardant fabric used in protective clothing for foundries

See also
UC Riverside Marlan and Rosemary Bourns College of Engineering